Peng Peiyun (Simplified Chinese: 彭珮云; born 1929 at Liuyang, Hunan Province, China) is a Chinese politician.

Biography 
Peng was admitted to the National Southwestern Associated University at 15. She graduated from Qinghua University and joined the Chinese Communist Party (CCP) in 1946. She held several positions in the CCP branches in public education institutions. She was assigned to the deputy secretary of the CCP committee in Beijing University before she was denounced by Nie Yuanzi, demoted and sent to the countryside in the Cultural Revolution.

Peng was rehabilitated near the end of the Cultural Revolution. She entered the Ministry of Education and became the vice minister before she was assigned the Minister of the National Family Planning Commission. In 1993 she became a member of the State Council. In 1998, she was elected the Vice Chairperson of the Standing Committee of the National People's Congress and the Chairwoman of the All-China Women's Federation. In 1999, she was elected the Chairperson of the Red Cross Society of China. She was reelected to the same position in 2004.

Peng was elected as a delegate to the 12th and 13th CCP National Congresses and to the 14th and 15th CCP Central Committees.

Personal life 
Peng married Wang Hanbin, a Chinese politician who was also elected the Vice Chairperson of the Standing Committee of the National People's Congress and CCP Central Committee. The couple have four children.

References 

|-

|-

1929 births
Living people
Tsinghua University alumni
Politicians from Changsha
People of the Cultural Revolution
People's Republic of China politicians from Hunan
Women state councillors of China
Vice Chairpersons of the National People's Congress
All-China Women's Federation people